Chebykin (Russian: Чебыкин) is a Russian masculine surname, its feminine counterpart is Chebykina. The surname may refer to the following notable people:
Nikolai Chebykin (born 1997), Russian ice hockey forward
Tatyana Chebykina (born 1968), Russian sprinter

Russian-language surnames